Menemsha Hills is a protected nature reserve located on Martha's Vineyard, Massachusetts in the town of Chilmark.  The property is owned by The Trustees of Reservations through three grants of land, the first in 1966. The reserve is adjacent to another Trustees property, The Brickyard.

References

External links 
 The Trustees of Reservations: Menemsha Hills
 The Trustees of Reservations: The Brickyard
 Trail map

The Trustees of Reservations
Geography of Martha's Vineyard
Tourist attractions in Chilmark, Massachusetts
Open space reserves of Massachusetts
Protected areas established in 1966
1966 establishments in Massachusetts